Marta Riba Carlos  (born 11 April 1972) from La Pobleta de Bellveí is a Spanish ski mountaineer. She is member of the Club Esqui Pobla.

Selected results 
 2011:
 6th, World Championship, team, together with Gemma Arró Ribot
 2012:
 2nd, European Championship, relay, together with Gemma Arró Ribot and Mireia Miró Varela
 6th, European Championship, team, together with Maria Fargues Gimeno

Patrouille des Glaciers 

 2010: 9th, together with Gemma Arró Ribot and Naila Jornet Burgada

Pierra Menta 

 2011: 6th, together with Izaskun Zubizarreta Guerendiain
 2012: 6th, together with Anna Comet Pascua
 2016: 5th, together with Ida Nilsson

External links 
 Marta Riba Carlos at skimountaineering.org

References 

1972 births
Living people
Ski mountaineers from Catalonia
People from Pallars Jussà
Sportspeople from the Province of Lleida
Spanish female ski mountaineers
21st-century Spanish women